The Controllers are a fictional extraterrestrial race existing in the DC Universe. They first appear in Adventure Comics #357 (June 1967), and were created by Jim Shooter, Mort Weisinger, and Curt Swan.

Fictional character biography

Pre-Crisis
In their initial appearance, the Controllers came from "another space-time continuum". Their universe had almost been destroyed by war, and they were determined to prevent the Earth-One universe from going the same way. They used their mind-control abilities to prevent intergalactic war, but also had powerful weapons, including the Sun-Eater. This concluded with "The Death of Ferro Lad" story where Ferro Lad dies destroying the Sun Eater. The Legion's long-time enemy Time Trapper was revealed to be a renegade Controller.

Maltusians
The Controllers' origins were changed during the Crisis on Infinite Earths events. They were now originally part of a race of immortals called the Maltusians. These beings left Maltus and colonized a new world called Oa. Now calling themselves Oans, they feel responsible for the catastrophic effects on the universe caused by one of their own, the renegade scientist Krona. The group argues over ways to handle the situation. One group of Oans desires to dedicate their immortal existences to contain evil. This group eventually became the Guardians of the Universe. Another group decides that evil should be destroyed. This group leaves planet Oa, eventually becoming the Controllers. It is also revealed that the Controllers left over the Guardians' decision to not destroy their former robot minions, the Manhunters, after the Manhunter rebellion on Oa.

Just as the Guardians slowly changed their physical appearances over billions of years of existence, so did the Controllers. Originally, all Oans were blue-skinned humanoids; currently, the Controllers are pink-skinned and hairless. The Controllers moved to another dimension and dedicated themselves to creating weapons that could be used to destroy evil beings if they became too dangerous. Among these are the Sun-Eaters, gaseous beings that can devour whole planets and stars, and the Miracle Machine, a device that can turn any thought into reality.

Controlling the Darkstars
The Controllers eventually recognized the benefits of having a law-enforcement agency at their disposal and formed the Network for the Establishment and Maintenance of Order (NEMO). Their agents were the Darkstars, armed with crimson exo-mantles that were powered by the Controllers' own energy. Many former members of the Green Lantern Corps joined the Darkstars after the Corps was destroyed. As time went on, the Controllers expressed concerns about the effectiveness of the Darkstars. More specifically, they were troubled that Darkstar agents were mostly looking after their own agendas rather than those of the Controllers. They withdrew their support from the Darkstars. This made many of the early Darkstar uniforms useless, as they relied on energy transmitted from the Controllers. The Darkstars are now defunct; most had been slain by the forces of Grayven.

Other Endeavors
In their continuing effort to create an alternative to the Green Lantern Corps, the Controllers experiment on Martyn Van Wyck, transforming him into the pyro-kinetic Effigy.  Their plans to create an entire organization of such beings, all brainwashed to serve the Controllers, was underway before Kyle Rayner learned of the plan and convinced the immortals to abandon it.

An unnamed Controller was featured in Power Company issues #12-14, where he is a prisoner of Doctor Polaris. The Power Company eventually succeeds in freeing him. He tells the group that his original reason for visiting the Earth was an attempt to re-secure a cosmic artifact called the "Mephistopheles Matrix".

In the series Trinity, a group of Controllers discover a Krona freed of his Cosmic Egg and aid him; though, when their treachery is discovered by Krona they are promptly eliminated.

In the Final Crisis storyline, the Controllers were revealed to survive into the 29th century, at which time they develop the Miracle Machine, whose schematics Superman memorizes upon a visit to the 31st century.

In the Blackest Night storyline, a small group of Controllers appeared in search of the "orange light of avarice", hoping to create their own Corps. This group locates the orange light on the planet Okaara, but they are slaughtered by Larfleeze, and assimilated as constructs in his Orange Lantern Corps.

DC Rebirth
The Controllers reveal themselves to be on the brink of extinction, and in order to prevent that, began kidnapping the Guardians of the Universe in order to use their DNA to create new conditions. By trapping them in a machine, the Controllers mined the Guardians' ancient Maltusian genes and twisted them into their own image, transforming them into Controllers. They also began a new campaign of the Darkstars which are according to them far more lethal than the previous generation and possess tactical capabilities that surpass those of the Green Lantern Corps. The Controllers were soon captured by the Darkstars' whose mantle had gained consciousness of their own and are now using the Controllers' psionic powers to link all Darkstars' thoughts and use the cosmic energy inside their bodies to fuel their foundry.

Powers and weapons
Similar to the Guardians of the Universe, the Controllers are one of the most powerful forces in the DC universe. Coming from the same race as the Guardians, they are immortal, have psionic powers like telepathy, telekinesis, and mind control, and they can manipulate cosmic energy. The Controllers also have vast knowledge, which allows them to create advanced technology and weapons. Their most known weapons are the Sun-Eater, Miracle Machine, and the Darkstar exo-mantle.

Other versions
In the future of the Legion of Super-Heroes, a renegade Controller became the villain known as the Time Trapper. Various DC Comics reboots have since altered this timeline, which is one of many origins given for the Time Trapper. The Controllers also ended up giving the Miracle Machine to the Legion for safekeeping.

In other media

Television
 A Pre-Crisis Controller appears in the two-part Legion of Super-Heroes episode "Sundown", voiced by David Lodge. This renegade Controller believes that the ultimate perfection comes from chaos, rather than order, and releases the last Sun-Eater in existence to spread this chaos across the universe. Superman was sent to stop him on his own while the Legion stops the Sun-Eater and an army of robots he has sent to protect it. The Controller's plan was foiled, but at the cost of the Legion member Ferro Lad's life. As he makes his escape, Superman warns him to never appear again.
 The Controllers briefly appear in the Batman: The Brave and the Bold episode "When OMAC Attacks". Batman alongside Hawk and Dove had to stop a war between the Controllers and the Warlords of Okaara.

Video games
 A Controller appears in the Wii version of Green Lantern: Rise of the Manhunters.

References

External links
The Book of Oa: Maltus
Cosmic Teams: Controllers
DCU Guide: Controllers

Characters created by Jim Shooter
Characters created by Curt Swan
Characters created by Mort Weisinger
DC Comics extraterrestrial supervillains
DC Comics supervillains
DC Comics characters who have mental powers
DC Comics telekinetics 
DC Comics telepaths
Fictional characters with energy-manipulation abilities 
Fictional characters who can manipulate light
Fictional characters with immortality
Green Lantern characters